Khuzdar (Brahui/;), historically known as Qusdar, is the capital city of Khuzdar District in the central part of Balochistan Province, Pakistan. Khuzdar is the 2nd-largest city of Balochistan province and It is the 47th largest city of Pakistan by population according to the 2017 census.. Historically, Khuzdar was the main city and capital of the Jhalawan province of the Khanate of Kalat. From October 1952 to 1955, it became part of the Balochistan States Union. In 1955, Khuzdar became the capital  of the newly formed Kalat Division. Currently. It is the largest Brahui-speaking city.

History
Khuzdar was the capital of the Brahui kingdom of Makran.

In the early 17th century it was part of the Jhalawan Kingdom, but it soon fell under the Khanate of Kalat, where it remained until a series of revolts during the reign of Khudadad Khan (1857–1893). By 1896, after Khudadad's death, the authority of Kalat was restored. Khuzdar was the capital and largest city of the Jhalawan province of the Khanate of Kalat.

Under a treaty with Kalat, the British appointed a political agent at Khuzdar in 1903. British assistance continued until 1947, after which the area was acceded  to Pakistan and became a democracy. When the Baluchistan States Union became Kalat Division, Khuzdar was established as the divisional headquarters. The divisional administration of Pakistan ended in 2000.  Khuzdar was again established as the Divisional headquarters in June 2009 by the Pakistan Peoples Party Government.

Education
Khuzdar serves as the learning center for the Balochistan province. The city has a number of government and private colleges, including the following:

Balochistan Residential College
Balochistan University of Engineering and Technology
Boys Degree College, Khuzdar
Al Farooq Residential School, khuzdar
Divisional Public School and College, Khuzdar
Girls Degree College, Khuzdar
Government College of Elementary Education (Women), Khuzdar
Hamdam College of Education, Khuzdar
Jhalawan Law College
Jhalawan Medical College
Lasbela University of Agriculture, Water and Marine Science, Khuzdar campus
Pakistan Public School, Khuzdar
Sardar Bahadur Khan Women's University, Khuzdar sub-campus
Shaheed Sikander Zarakzai University, Khuzdar
Sunrise Public School and College, Khuzdar
Workers Model Higher Secondary School

Geography and climate
Despite this altitude, Khuzdar like most of Balochistan has an arid climate (Köppen BWh) with very low and erratic rainfall. Unlike most parts of the province, the heaviest average rainfall comes from the Asian monsoon in July and August, though this rainfall tends to be very erratic and in many summers there is no significant rain at all.

References

Populated places in Khuzdar District
Khuzdar District